M.D. was a short lived comic book published by EC Comics in 1955, the sixth title in its New Direction line. The bi-monthly comic was published by Bill Gaines and edited  by Al Feldstein. It lasted a total of five issues before being cancelled along with EC's other New Direction comics.

Content
M.D. focused on medical stories, surgical practices and the day-to-day work of doctors. Each issue featured four stories, plus at least one text piece about a real-life major medical figure.

The frontispiece to the first issue set out its role:

...the Hippocratic Oath was then reprinted in full.

The letters page (upon the first of which the above text appeared in lieu of early letters) was titled "The Needles", and contributors to M.D. include Graham Ingels, Marie Severin, George Evans, Joe Orlando, Reed Crandall and Carl Wessler.

Reprints
M.D. was reprinted as part of publisher Russ Cochran's Complete EC Library collection, alongside Valor and Impact as Volume 2 of the "New Direction Part 2" slipcased set (1985). Between September 1999 and January 2000, Cochran and Gemstone Publishing reprinted the five individual issues. This complete run was later rebound, with covers included, in a single softcover EC Annual.

Issue guide

Bimonthly magazines published in the United States
Comics magazines published in the United States
Comics by Carl Wessler
Defunct magazines published in the United States
Fiction magazines
EC Comics publications
Magazines established in 1955
Magazines disestablished in 1956
1955 comics debuts
1955 comics endings
Fictional physicians
1955 establishments in New York (state)